Debora M. Kane is a Professor of Physics at Macquarie University, where her research interests are in non-linear optics and laser physics. She is a Fellow of The Optical Society and has edited four books on nanotechnology, nanomaterials and semiconductor lasers.

Early life and education 
Kane obtained a bachelor's degree from the University of Otago in 1979. In 1983, she received her PhD from the University of St Andrews. Her thesis used optical spectroscopy techniques to study atomic transitions in various materials for applications in laser physics.

Research and career 

Kane began her postdoctoral career as a research fellow at the University of Southampton in 1984, working on developing techniques to improve the operation of dye lasers. In 1986, she moved to Massey University, where she became a lecturer in physics.

Kane has been at the Department of Physics at Macquarie University since 1989, serving as Head of department from 2003 to 2006, and now holds a personal chair in Physics. Her current research spans various aspects of laser physics, particularly non-linear optics and dynamics in semiconductor lasers, how laser technologies can be used for applications in surface science studies and nanomaterial processing, and the development of new visible and ultraviolet light sources.

Awards and honours 

 Fellow of The Optical Society, 2017
 Chair of the IUPAC Commission on Laser Physics and Photonics, 2015-17
 Australian Institute of Physics Women in Physics Lecturer and Medallist, 2006

Selected publications 
Kane has co-authored over 200 academic publications and nine book chapters on laser physics. She has also edited four books: Nanomaterials: Science and Applications (2016), Nanotechnology in Australia: Showcase of Early Career Research (2011), Laser Cleaning II (2007), and Unlocking Dynamic Diversity: Optical Feedback Effects on Semiconductor Lasers (2005).

References 

Living people
Women in optics
21st-century women scientists
Fellows of Optica (society)
University of Otago alumni
Alumni of the University of St Andrews
Academic staff of Macquarie University
Year of birth missing (living people)